Obesity in Sweden has been increasingly cited as a major health issue in recent years. Sweden is the 90th fattest country in the world. In 2009, the number of people who are considered overweight or obese had not increased for the first time in 70 years. Claude Marcus, a leading Swedish nutrition expert from the Karolinska Institutet, stated that one solution is to introduce a fat tax. Folksam refused to insure a 5-year-old girl from Orust. The insurance company refused her insurance based on "serious overweight/obesity". A report showed that children whose parents were better educated had a lower chance of becoming overweight.

Cause

Lack of exercise along with sugar-sweetened foods and drinks have caused one out of six five-year-olds in Sweden to be overweight or obese. The breakdown is 12.9% of children are considered overweight and 4.3% are considered obese.

Effects

Several studies in Sweden shown that obese men tend to have a lower sperm count, fewer rapidly mobile sperm and fewer progressively motile sperm compared to normal-weight men.

Programs

School nurses in Uppsala, Uppsala County, will be prescribing exercise to teenage children. The prescribed exercise can be anything from participating in a sport to walking. Spaces will be available for the participants.

Forbes ranking 2007

Source: Forbes.com

References

Sweden
Health in Sweden